Étude Op. 25, No. 5 in E minor, is a technical study composed by Frédéric Chopin in 1837. Marking a serious departure in the expected technique developed previously, Chopin wrote this étude with a series of quick, dissonant minor seconds. The effect has earned the étude the nickname "Wrong Note".

Structure 
After the first theme of 'minor seconds' closes, Chopin introduces a Più Lento section in which a new melody (without dissonant minor seconds) is played in the parallel key, E major. The final section of the piece starts with a recapitulation of the first theme, with climaxes in a coda played in E Major.   

The second section is marked as Più Lento (It. More Slow) despite Chopin's metronome mark of ♩=168, a very quick tempo.

Étude Op. 25, No. 5 features an unusual overall structure, surrounding a major second theme, with the minor main theme. This idea appears only one other time in Chopin's set, in Étude Op. 25, No. 10. Styling the études in this fashion further emphasizes Chopin's deviation from the standard set before him by composers such as Carl Czerny.

External links 
 
 Op. 25, No. 5 played by Alfred Cortot
 Op. 25, No. 5 played by Arthur Rubinstein
 Op. 25, No. 5 played by Claudio Arrau
 Op. 25, No. 5 played by Shura Cherkassky
 Op. 25, No. 5 played by Jorge Bolet
 Op. 25, No. 5 played by Samson François
 Op. 25, No. 5 played by Géza Anda
 Op. 25, No. 5 played by Vladimir Ashkenazy
 Op. 25, No. 5 played by Maurizio Pollini

25 05
1837 compositions
Compositions in E minor